William Brand WS FRSE (5 January 1807, Peterhead, Aberdeenshire – 18 October 1869) was a Scottish solicitor, banker, botanist and plant collector.

Biography 
He was born in Peterhead in Scotland the son of Charles Brand a farmer. He attended parish schools, and completed a medical degree at the university of Edinburgh. It was around this time that he grew an interest for botany.

After his studies, William Brand was apprenticed to Scott, Findlay and Balderston, rising to become a partner in 1834, the year he also became a Writer to the Signet. In 1836 he is shown as working from 18 Dundas Street in Edinburgh's New Town.

He served as secretary to the Union Bank of Scotland from 1846 to 1869.

He was a founding member of the Botanical Society of Edinburgh on 8 February 1836, and the discoverer of the Astragalus alpinus.

A bust of William Brand stands in the library of the Royal Botanic Garden Edinburgh.

Distinctions 

 1863: Fellow of the Royal Society of Edinburgh

Personal life 
In 1848, William Brand married Eleanor Bruce Mitchell. They had 3 children.

References

1807 births
1869 deaths
19th-century British botanists
19th-century Scottish people
Scottish botanists
Scottish solicitors
Scottish bankers
Plant collectors
Fellows of the Royal Society of Edinburgh
People from Peterhead
19th-century Scottish businesspeople